In My Skin is a British comedy drama television series written by Kayleigh Llewellyn that premiered on BBC Three on 14 October 2018. The series was initially ordered as a short film for BBC Wales, but this later acted as the pilot episode after BBC ordered In My Skin as a full series. The series stars Gabrielle Creevy, James Wilbraham, Poppy Lee Friar, Jo Hartley, Aled ap Steffan, Di Botcher, Georgia Furlong and Rhodri Meilir. In March 2021, In My Skin was renewed for a second and final series, which premiered on 7 November 2021. The series has received critical acclaim, as well as numerous awards from ceremonies including BAFTA Cymru and the RTS Programme Awards.

Premise
In My Skin focuses on Welsh teenager Bethan who is trying to live a double life as she negotiates her mother's mental illness, friendships and her sexuality. Her mother has bipolar disorder, and is sectioned in a psychiatric ward. Bethan dreams of being a writer, but attends a hostile and homophobic school.

Cast and characters

Main
 Gabrielle Creevy as Bethan, a 16-year-old school student who is hiding her troubled home life from people at school
 James Wilbraham as Travis, a gay school student who is best friends with Bethan and Lydia
 Poppy Lee Friar as Lydia, a rule breaking school student who is best friends with Bethan and Travis
 Jo Hartley as Katrina, Bethan's mother who suffers from bipolar disorder
 Aled ap Steffan as Stan Priest, a school student who bullies Bethan
 Di Botcher as Nana Margie, Bethan's grandmother
 Rhodri Meilir as Dilwyn, Bethan's alcoholic father

Recurring
 Zadeiah Campbell-Davies as Poppy, a popular girl who encourages Bethan to kiss her - then drops her.
 Alexandria Riley as Ms Morgan, an English teacher who supports Bethan's creativity
 Suzanne Packer as Nurse Digby, a nurse at the psychiatric hospital
 Laura Checkley as Ms Blocker, a PE teacher
 Richard Corgan as Tony Chipper, an employee at the chip shop who takes advantage of Lydia (series 1)
 Georgia Furlong as Lorraine, an unpopular girl who Poppy makes fun of
 Jac Yarrow as Jamie, a student who helps Bethan with her campaign posters (series 1)
 Dave Wong as Alfred, a mentally ill patient at the hospital (series 1)
 Lu Corfield as Head Teacher, the headteacher of the school
 Ellen Robertson as Jodie, a nurse on the psychiatric ward (series 1)
 Rebekah Murrell as Cam, a lesbian student who Bethan develops a crush on (series 2)
 Steffan Rhodri as Perry, a kind man Katrina forms a relationship with behind Dilwyn's back (series 2). He has a daughter with Down Syndrome.
 Olivia Southgate as Ffion, Perry's daughter (series 2)

Production
In My Skin was initially ordered as a short film for BBC Wales, which was filmed across five days. This later acted as the pilot episode when BBC Three ordered In My Skin as a full series. Produced by Expectation Entertainment, it acts as the company's first scripted commission. Creator and writer Kayleigh Llewellyn stated that her draft for the series was "warmly received" by the BBC, and director Lucy Forbes joined the project due to "the power of the subject matter". Llewellyn explained that she and casting director Rachel Sheridan were focused on having local Welsh actors appear in the series, as they could bring the "characters to life". The series is filmed in Cardiff, Wales. The first series was, according to Llewellyn, "written in five weeks, shot in five weeks and shot on a budget of £500." In March 2021, BBC renewed In My Skin for a second and final series. Llewellyn stated that she was excited to "finish telling Bethan's story", and that in the writing process she was "oscillating between laughing uproariously and ugly crying". Molly Manners was chosen to direct the second series, with Llewellyn voicing her excitement at Manners' involvement. Filming for the second series commenced on 29 March 2021 in Cardiff. Filming wrapped on 1 May 2021. The second series premiered on 7 November 2021.

Episodes

Series 1 (2018–2020)

Series 2 (2021)

Reception

Critical reception
For the first series, the review aggregator website Rotten Tomatoes reported a 100% approval rating with an average rating of 7.2/10, based on 13 critic reviews. Metacritic, which uses a weighted average, assigned a score of 78 out of 100 based on 8 critics, indicating "generally favorable reviews".

Rhiannon Lucy Cosslett of The Guardian described In My Skin as "an emotional rollercoaster of a TV drama", writing that it is " a series of huge emotional heft, and an extraordinary achievement by writer Kayleigh Llewellyn, who surely has huge things ahead of her". The Sunday Times listed the series as a "critics' choice", writing that it is a "mesmerising drama", adding that Creevy and Hartley's performances were "remarkable". Annie Lord, writing for The Independent, described In My Skin as a "hilariously dark coming-of-age drama [that] cuts deep", and that "Llewellyn's dialogue is caustic and sharp". Time listed it as one of the best five television series of July 2020. Time wrote: "A combination of black humor, raw depictions of trauma and authentic performances mark the series as part of the same wave of British TV that includes auteurs like Phoebe Waller-Bridge and Michaela Coel. Llewellyn may not be the public face of her show, the way those women are, but she too is speaking from the heart—and her message resonates". In November 2021, the second series of this Welsh comedy drama would receive 5 stars in Rebecca Nicholson's Guardian TV review, stating that it is "a poignant must-see which deserves widespread acclaim".

Awards and nominations

References

External links
 
 

2018 British television series debuts
2021 British television series endings
2010s British black comedy television series
2020s British black comedy television series
2010s British comedy-drama television series
2020s British comedy-drama television series
2010s British teen television series
2020s British teen television series
2010s British LGBT-related drama television series
2020s British LGBT-related drama television series
BAFTA winners (television series)
BBC television sitcoms
British high school television series
British teen drama television series
English-language television shows
Gay-related television shows
Lesbian-related television shows
Television series about teenagers
Television shows set in Cardiff
Youth culture in the United Kingdom
2010s British LGBT-related comedy television series
2020s British LGBT-related comedy television series